Adventure on the Southern Express is a 1934 German thriller film directed by Erich Waschneck and starring Charlotte Susa, Karl Ludwig Diehl and Ralph Arthur Roberts. It was shot on location in Northern Italy and Switzerland.

Synopsis
While a train is travelling through the Italian Alps, the jewellery of a wealthy young widow is stolen. An ex-soldier working as a waiter on the train comes under suspicion of the crime.

Cast
 Charlotte Susa as Lisa von Hellwitz, eine junge Witwe
 Karl Ludwig Diehl as Hans Lenzfeld, Speisewagenkellner
 Ralph Arthur Roberts as Prinz Tarnoff
 Richard Romanowsky as Prof. Eberhard Degenfeld, Privatgelehrter
 Charly Berger
 Elli Blank
 Walter Dysing
 Angelo Ferrari
 Baby Gray as Singer
 Lotte Haas
 Trude Haefelin
 Paul Heidemann as Schnäbeli, Privatdetektiv
 Carola Höhn
 Fred Immler
 Walter Krilla
 Otto Kronburger as Diener des Prinzen
 Maria Loja
 Hans Richter as Max, Pikkolo im Speisewagen
 Annemarie Schwindt
 Hans Stiebner
 Michael von Newlinsky
 Wolfgang von Schwindt

References

Bibliography

External links 
 

1934 films
Films directed by Erich Waschneck
1930s German-language films
Films of Nazi Germany
German thriller films
1930s thriller films
German black-and-white films
Films scored by Robert Stolz
1930s German films